The Ohio River Islands National Wildlife Refuge (ORINWR) is a National Wildlife Refuge (NWR) in non-contiguous sites consisting of islands along  of the Ohio River, primarily (85% of acreage) in the U.S. state of West Virginia. There are also two islands upstream in Beaver County, Pennsylvania, and a pair downstream in Lewis County, Kentucky. Going downstream, the refuge is currently located in parts of these counties: Beaver, Brooke, Ohio, Marshall, Wetzel, Tyler, Pleasants, Wood, Jackson, Mason, and Lewis. All counties are in West Virginia, with the exceptions in Pennsylvania and Kentucky mentioned above. The refuge headquarters and visitor center is located in Williamstown, West Virginia.

Islands
The following islands in the Ohio River are part of the Ohio River Islands National Wildlife Refuge. All are in West Virginia unless indicated otherwise.

 Phillis Island (Pennsylvania)
 Georgetown Island (Pennsylvania)
 Wheeling Island – part
 Captina Island
 Fish Creek Island
 Paden Island
 Williamson Island
 Witten Towhead
 Crab Island
 Wells Island
 Mill Creek Island
 Grandview Island
 Grape Island
 Middle Island
 Broadback Island
 Buckley Island
 Muskingum Island
 Neal Island – part
 Buffington Island
 Letart Island
 Manchester 1 Island (Kentucky)
 Manchester 2 Island (Kentucky) - part

References

External links
Official website
 

National Wildlife Refuges in Kentucky
National Wildlife Refuges in Pennsylvania
National Wildlife Refuges in West Virginia
Protected areas of West Virginia
Protected areas established in 1990
Protected areas of Beaver County, Pennsylvania
Protected areas of Wood County, West Virginia
Protected areas of Wetzel County, West Virginia
Protected areas of Tyler County, West Virginia
Protected areas of Pleasants County, West Virginia
Protected areas of Ohio County, West Virginia
Protected areas of Mason County, West Virginia
Protected areas of Marshall County, West Virginia
Protected areas of Jackson County, West Virginia
Protected areas of Lewis County, Kentucky
1990 establishments in Kentucky
1990 establishments in Pennsylvania
1990 establishments in West Virginia